Steve Bernard Miles Chimombo (4 September 1945 – 11 December 2015)  was a Malawian writer, poet, editor and teacher. He was born in Zomba.

Life
He was educated at Zomba Catholic Secondary School, then at the University of Malawi where he earned a B.A. At the University of Wales, he took a teaching diploma in English as a Second Language. At Columbia University in the United States, he was awarded his M.A. and Ph.D. in teaching. After studying at Leeds, England, Chimombo returned to Malawi to edit the literary bulletin Outlook-lookout.

He was a professor of English at Chancellor College in Malawi and was considered one of the nation's leading writers. In 1988 his Napolo Poems gained him honorable mention for the Noma Award for Publishing in Africa. He was married to Moira Chimombo.

The poet Stanley Onjezani Kenani wrote the following appreciation of Chimombo: "Except for J.W. Gwengwe, D.D. Phiri, Jack Mapanje, and Francis Chipasula, I cannot think of any Malawian who has contributed more to Malawian literature than Prof. Chimombo." He died at the age of 70 on 11 December 2015 in Blantyre.

Works

Poetry
 Napolo Poems, Manchichi Publishers, 1987
 Python! Python! An Epic Poem, Wasi Publications, 1992
 Napolo and the Python, Heinemann Educational Publishers, 1994,

Plays
 The Rainmaker (1975)
 Wachiona Ndani? (1983)

Novels
 The Basket Girl, Popular Publications, 1990
 The Wrath of Napolo, Wasi Publications, 2000,

Children's literature
 The Bird Boy's Song, Wasi Publications, 2002,

Short stories
 The Hyena Wears Darkness (2006)

Nonfiction
 Malawian Oral Literature: The Aesthetics of Indigenous Arts (1988)
 The Culture of Democracy: Language, Literature, the Arts and Politics in Malawi, 1992–94 (1996)

Anthologies

References

1945 births
2015 deaths
Malawian poets
Malawian writers
University of Malawi alumni
Alumni of the University of Wales
Alumni of the University of Leeds
Teachers College, Columbia University alumni
Academic staff of the University of Malawi
Malawian dramatists and playwrights
International Writing Program alumni
Chewa-language writers